Adhari may be:
 a common name of the extinct Old Azeri language
 an alternative romanisation of the word Azari

See also 
 Adhari Park, in Bahrain